Mr. Wong in Chinatown is a 1939 American mystery film directed by William Nigh and starring Boris Karloff as Mr. Wong.

The film is the third in the series of Mr. Wong.

Plot

A beautiful Chinese woman visits Mr. Wong late at night but is murdered before she can tell him why she needs his help. Wong discovers that she is Princess Lin Hwa, the sister of a powerful Chinese general, and that she was killed with a poisoned dart fired from a Chinese "sleeve gun."

As with some of his previous investigations, Wong is given important information by the leader of a powerful tong (Chinese secret society). The tong leader tells Wong that the princess had come to the United States with almost $1-million to arrange the secret purchase of airplanes that were to be smuggled into China.

As Wong continues the investigation he learns that all the money that the princess deposited in a local bank has been paid out—and that the signature on most of the checks is a forgery. Wong becomes the target of a killer, and is aided in his investigation by a blonde, beautiful and energetic newspaper reporter.

Was the princess killed by enemies of her brother to prevent the shipment of the planes to China? Or was she killed to hide the fact that there actually were no planes and the whole scheme was a scam?

Wong's careful conversations with the captain of the ship the princess traveled on, the owner of the aviation company that owned the planes she was going to buy, and the president of the bank where the princess deposited her money, result in him uncovering the identity of the killer.

Cast
 Boris Karloff as Mr. James Lee Wong
 Marjorie Reynolds as Roberta 'Bobbie' Logan (reporter)
 Grant Withers as Police Capt. Bill Street
 Huntley Gordon as Mr. Davidson (bank president)
 George Lynn as Capt. Guy Jackson (Aviation Corp. president) (as Peter George Lynn)
 William Royle as Capt. Jaime (captain, Maid of the Orient)
 James Flavin as Police Sgt. Jerry
 Lotus Long as Princess Lin Hwa (murder victim)
 Lee Tung Foo as Willie (Wong's servant) (as Lee Tong Foo)
 Bessie Loo as Lilly May (Princess Lin Hwa's maid)
 Richard Loo as Tong chief
 Ernie Stanton as Burton (Davidson's butler)
 I. Stanford Jolley as Hotel clerk
 Angelo Rossitto as Mute Little Person (uncredited)

References

External links
 
 
 

1939 films
1939 mystery films
American black-and-white films
American mystery films
Films directed by William Nigh
American sequel films
Monogram Pictures films
Films set in San Francisco
Chinatown, San Francisco in fiction
1930s English-language films
1930s American films